Muhammad Ali and Karl Mildenberger fought a boxing match on September 10, 1966. While Mildenberger's unorthodox southpaw style caused Ali some discomfort in the early rounds of the bout, Ali won the fight through a technical knockout after the referee stopped the bout in the 12th round. This was the first time a sports event was broadcast via satellite through color telecast.

References

Mildenberger
1966 in boxing
World Boxing Council heavyweight championship matches
September 1966 sports events